Omid, also transliterated as Omeed, Umeed or Ümit (Turkish equivalent), is a common Persian male given name, meaning hope.

Given name
 Omid Abolhassani, Iranian football player banned for four years
 Omid Abtahi, Iranian-American actor
 Omid Djalili, Iranian-British stand up comedian and actor
 Omid Ebrahimi, Iranian footballer
 Omid Kordestani, Iranian-American Google executive
 Omid Memarian, Iranian journalist and social activist
 Omid Namazi, Iranian-American soccer player
 Omid Nouripour, German-Iranian politician
Omid Rahimi, American anatomist
 Omid Ravankhah, Iranian footballer
 Omid Safi, American religion academic
 Omid Tahvili, Iranian-Canadian criminal
 Omid Walizadeh, American underground hip hop producer
 Omid Shafiyi, a famous League of Legends player.

Surname
 Ghazal Omid, Iranian-Canadian author
 Pierre Omidyar, French-born American entrepreneur and the founder of eBay

Other uses
Omid, first Iranian-launched satellite, launched on February 2, 2009
 "Omid", an electronic database of human rights violations in Iran, acting as a memorial to the victims executed by the Islamic Republic since it was established in 1979.
 "Omid", a song on Thievery Corporation's album The Richest Man in Babylon
 Apache Omid, an open source transaction processing system for Apache HBase
 M. Omid, pen name of Mehdi Akhavan-Sales, notable contemporary Iranian poet

References

Persian masculine given names